Jalen Tate (born June 18, 1998) is an American professional basketball player for KB Peja of the Kosovo Basketball Superleague. He played college basketball for the Northern Kentucky Norse and the Arkansas Razorbacks.

High school career
Tate attended Pickerington High School Central in Pickerington, Ohio. He helped his team win three district titles and was a two-time All-Ohio Capital Conference selection. In his senior season, Tate averaged 17.2 points, 6.7 rebounds, 3.7 assists and 2.1 steals per game.

College career
Eight games into his career at Northern Kentucky, Tate suffered a season-ending injury, breaking the metacarpal bone in his left hand against Norfolk State. He was granted a medical redshirt. As a freshman, Tate averaged 5.7 points, 2.3 rebounds and two assists per game, earning Horizon League All-Freshman Team and All-Defensive Team honors. He averaged 13.7 points, 4.4 rebounds and 4.1 assists per game as a sophomore and repeated on the Horizon League All-Defensive Team. On February 14, 2020, Tate posted a career-high 31 points, seven assists, six rebounds and six steals in an 84–70 win over IUPUI. In his junior season, he averaged 13.9 points, 5.4 rebounds, 3.6 assists and 1.9 steals per game. Tate earned Third Team All-Horizon League honors and was named Horizon League Defensive Player of the Year. He led Northern Kentucky to its second straight Horizon League tournament title and was named tournament MVP. For his senior season, Tate moved to Arkansas as a graduate transfer.

Professional career
On October 9, 2021, Tate signed with Gießen 46ers of the Basketball Bundesliga.

Career statistics

College

|-
| style="text-align:left;"| 2016–17
| style="text-align:left;"| Northern Kentucky
| 8 || 8 || 18.8 || .412 || .100 || .333 || 2.0 || 1.6 || .9 || .3 || 4.6
|-
| style="text-align:left;"| 2017–18
| style="text-align:left;"| Northern Kentucky
| 32 || 32 || 22.9 || .470 || .214 || .636 || 2.3 || 2.0 || 1.4 || .6 || 5.7
|-
| style="text-align:left;"| 2018–19
| style="text-align:left;"| Northern Kentucky
| 31 || 23 || 27.0 || .539 || .407 || .610 || 4.4 || 4.1 || 1.2 || .7 || 13.7
|-
| style="text-align:left;"| 2019–20
| style="text-align:left;"| Northern Kentucky
| 22 || 20 || 30.2 || .485 || .182 || .676 || 5.4 || 3.6 || 1.9 || .5 || 13.9
|-
| style="text-align:left;"| 2020–21
| style="text-align:left;"| Arkansas
| 32 || 32 || 29.5 || .485 || .342 || .713 || 3.8 || 3.8 || 1.1 || .4 || 11.0
|- class="sortbottom"
| style="text-align:center;" colspan="2"| Career
| 125 || 115 || 26.6 || .496 || .300 || .637 || 3.7 || 3.3 || 1.3 || .5 || 10.4

Personal life
Tate's father, Jermaine, played college basketball for Ohio State and Cincinnati before embarking on a 13-year professional career. His older brother, Jae'Sean, also competed for Ohio State and plays in the NBA for the Houston Rockets, while his sister, Jada, plays college basketball for Tiffin.

References

External links
 Jalen Tate at RealGM
 Arkansas Razorbacks bio
 Northern Kentucky Norse bio

1998 births
Living people
American expatriate basketball people in Canada
American expatriate basketball people in Germany
American expatriate basketball people in Kosovo
American expatriate basketball people in Mexico
American men's basketball players
Arkansas Razorbacks men's basketball players
Basketball players from Ohio
Giessen 46ers players
KB Peja players
Niagara River Lions players
Northern Kentucky Norse men's basketball players
Ostioneros de Guaymas (basketball) players
Shooting guards
Sportspeople from Toledo, Ohio